Peter Aron Abeles (February 15, 1886 – September 12, 1952) was a Jewish Romanian-American lawyer, politician, and judge.

Life 
Abeles was born on February 15, 1886, in Oltenița, Kingdom of Romania, the son of Aron Abeles and Rebecca Isser. He immigrated to America in 1895.

Abeles attended DeWitt Clinton High School. He started worked as an accountant in around 1904. He then attended New York University School of Law, graduating from there in 1909. He was admitted to the bar in 1914 and began practicing law in New York City.

In 1918, Abeles was elected to the New York State Senate as a Republican with the endorsement of the Democratic Party, representing New York's 22nd State Senate district (parts of Bronx County). He served in the Senate in 1919 and 1920. From 1924 to 1935, he was a Special U.S. Attorney of the Department of Justice and worked with the United States Court of Customs and Patent Appeals. In 1935, Mayor La Guardia appointed him to the Magistrates Court. Abeles and La Guardia were friends for many years. In 1941, he was reappointed to the court for a ten year term.

Abeles was a member of the Bronx Bar Association, the Independent Order of B'nai B'rith, the Zionist Order of America, the New York State Association of Magistrates, the Freemasons, and was a director of the Hebrew Home for Chronic Invalids. In 1913, he married Minerva Lobel. Their children were Audrey Lobel, Lowell Isser, Sheldon Abbott, Rodman Brandon, and Arynne Lucy. Minerva was co-leader of the Fusion Party in the Bronx.

Abeles died from a heart ailment while in a stationery store, where he went to make a telephone call, on September 12, 1952.

References

External links 

 The Political Graveyard

1886 births
1952 deaths
People from Oltenița
American people of Romanian-Jewish descent
Romanian emigrants to the United States
Politicians from the Bronx
Lawyers from New York City
DeWitt Clinton High School alumni
New York University School of Law alumni
American accountants
20th-century American lawyers
20th-century American politicians
Democratic Party New York (state) state senators
Jewish American state legislators in New York (state)
Jewish American attorneys
20th-century American judges
Municipal judges in the United States
New York (state) state court judges
American Freemasons